The 2022–23 Youngstown State Penguins men's basketball team represented Youngstown State University in the 2022–23 NCAA Division I men's basketball season. The Penguins, led by sixth-year head coach Jerrod Calhoun, played their home games at the Beeghly Center in Youngstown, Ohio as members of the Horizon League. They finished the regular season 23–8, 15–5 in Horizon League play to finish in first place. They defeated Detroit Mercy in the first round of the Horizon League tournament, before an upset loss to eventual tournament winners Northern Kentucky. As the regular season leader who didn't win their conference tournament, the Penguins received an auto-bid to play in the 2023 National Invitation Tournament, where they lost to Oklahoma State in the first round.

With a final record of 24–10, the 2022–23 season marked the Penguins' best season in Division I play.

Previous season
The Penguins finished the 2021–22 season 19–15, 12–9 in Horizon League play to finish in seventh place. They were defeated by Robert Morris in the first round of the Horizon League tournament. They received an invitation to The Basketball Classic, where they would defeat Morgan State in the first round, before falling to Fresno State in the quarterfinals.

Roster

Schedule and results

|-
!colspan=12 style=| Regular season

|-
!colspan=12 style=| Horizon League tournament

|-
!colspan=12 style=| NIT

Sources

References

Youngstown State Penguins men's basketball seasons
Youngstown State Penguins
Youngstown State Penguins men's basketball
Youngstown State Penguins men's basketball
Youngstown